The consensus 1958 College Basketball All-American team, as determined by aggregating the results of six major All-American teams.  To earn "consensus" status, a player must win honors from a majority of the following teams: the Associated Press, the USBWA, The United Press International, the National Association of Basketball Coaches, the Newspaper Enterprise Association (NEA), and the International News Service.

1958 Consensus All-America team

Individual All-America teams

AP Honorable Mention:

Bucky Allen, Duke
Gene Brown, San Francisco
Leo Byrd, Marshall
Barney Cable, Bradley
Boo Ellis, Niagara
Wayne Embry, Miami (OH)
Dom Flora, Washington and Lee
Dave Gambee, Oregon State
Hal Greer, Marshall
Fred Grim, Arkansas
Vernon Hatton, Kentucky
Joe Hobbs, Florida
Frank Howard, Ohio State
Jack Kubiszyn, Alabama
Red Murrell, Drake
Jack Parr, Kansas State
Hub Reed, Oklahoma City
Earl Robinson, California
Gary Simmons, Idaho
Doug Smart, Washington
Tony Windis, Wyoming

See also
 1957–58 NCAA University Division men's basketball season

References

NCAA Men's Basketball All-Americans
All-Americans